Puchezh-Katunki is a meteor crater located in the Nizhny Novgorod Oblast of the Volga Federal District, Russia. Argon–argon dating has constrained the age of formation to be 195.9 ± 1.0 million years old, placing it within the Sinemurian stage of the Early Jurassic. The crater is not exposed to the surface, but appears as variation in the vegetation.

Description 

See also 

 Obolon' crater

References 

Impact craters of Russia
Jurassic impact craters
Jurassic Russia
Landforms of Nizhny Novgorod Oblast

Sinemurian Stage